Der Rheinlander was a German restaurant in Portland, Oregon's Rose City Park neighborhood, in the United States. It was established by chef Horst Mager, who is originally from Wiesbaden, Germany, in 1963. The restaurant was "under reconsideration for redevelopment" in February 2016, and closed in early 2017.

See also

 List of defunct restaurants of the United States
 List of German restaurants

References

External links
 

1963 establishments in Oregon
2017 disestablishments in Oregon
Defunct European restaurants in Portland, Oregon
Defunct German restaurants in the United States
German restaurants in Portland, Oregon
Restaurants disestablished in 2017
Restaurants established in 1963
Rose City Park, Portland, Oregon